Iola High School is a fully accredited high school located in Iola, Kansas, United States, serving students in grades 9–12. The current principal is Scott Carson. The mascot is Marv the Mustang. The school colors are blue and gold.

Extracurricular activities

Athletics
The Mustangs compete in the Pioneer League and are classified as a 4A school,  by the KSHSAA. Throughout the history of Iola athletics, the Mustangs have won 3 state championships and the Fillies have won 1 (see table below).

State championships

See also
 List of high schools in Kansas
 List of unified school districts in Kansas

References

External links
 

Schools in Allen County, Kansas
Educational institutions in the United States with year of establishment missing
Public high schools in Kansas